The 1996 Australian Sports Sedan Championship was a CAMS sanctioned Australian motor racing championship open to Group 2D Sports Sedans. The title, which was the twelfth Australian Sports Sedan Championship, was won by John Briggs driving a Honda Prelude Chevrolet.

Schedule
The championship was contested over a four round series.

Championship results

References

External links
 www.youtube.com – Highlights of the Sandown round of the championship

National Sports Sedan Series
Sports Sedan Championship